The year 1997 is the fifth year in the history of Pancrase, a mixed martial arts promotion based in Japan. In 1997 Pancrase held 14 events beginning with Pancrase: Alive 1.

Title fights

Events list

Pancrase: Alive 1

Pancrase: Alive 1 was an event held on January 17, 1997, at Korakuen Hall in Tokyo, Japan.

Results

Pancrase: Alive 2

Pancrase: Alive 2 was an event held on February 22, 1997, at the Tokyo Bay NK Hall in Urayasu, Chiba, Japan.

Results

Pancrase: Alive 3

Pancrase: Alive 3 was an event held on March 22, 1997, at the Tsuyuhashi Sport Center in Nagoya, Aichi, Japan.

Results

Pancrase: Alive 4

Pancrase: Alive 4 was an event held on April 27, 1997, at Tokyo Bay NK Hall in Urayasu, Chiba, Japan.

Results

Pancrase: Alive 5

Pancrase: Alive 5 was an event held on May 24, 1997, at the Kobe Fashion Mart in Kobe, Hyogo, Japan.

Results

Pancrase: Alive 6

Pancrase: Alive 6 was an event held on June 18, 1997, at Korakuen Hall in Tokyo, Japan.

Results

Pancrase: Alive 7

Pancrase: Alive 7 was an event held on June 30, 1997, at Hakata Star Lanes in Hakata-ku, Fukuoka, Japan.

Results

Pancrase: 1997 Neo-Blood Tournament, Round 1

Pancrase: 1997 Neo-Blood Tournament, Round 1 was an event held on July 20, 1997, at Korakuen Hall in Tokyo, Japan.

Results

Pancrase: 1997 Neo-Blood Tournament, Round 2

Pancrase: 1997 Neo-Blood Tournament, Round 2 was an event held on July 20, 1997, at Korakuen Hall in Tokyo, Japan.

Results

Pancrase: Alive 8

Pancrase: Alive 8 was an event held on August 9, 1997, at Umeda Stella Hall in Osaka, Osaka, Japan.

Results

Pancrase: 1997 Anniversary Show

Pancrase: 1997 Anniversary Show was an event held on September 6, 1997, at Tokyo Bay NK Hall in Urayasu, Chiba, Japan.

Results

Pancrase: Alive 9

Pancrase: Alive 9 was an event held on October 29, 1997, at Korakuen Hall in Tokyo, Japan.

Results

Pancrase: Alive 10

Pancrase: Alive 10 was an event held on November 16, 1997, at the Kobe Fashion Mart in Kobe, Hyogo, Japan.

Results

Pancrase: Alive 11

Pancrase: Alive 11 was an event held on December 20, 1997, at the Yokohama Cultural Gymnasium in Yokohama, Kanagawa, Japan.

Results

See also 
 Pancrase
 List of Pancrase champions
 List of Pancrase events

References

Pancrase events
1997 in mixed martial arts